Follina is a comune (municipality) in the Province of Treviso in the Italian region Veneto, located about  northwest of Venice and about  northwest of Treviso.

Situated in the Treviso countryside, on the “Strada del Prosecco” (“Prosecco wine route”), it is a village in the landscape of Veneto's pre-Alps.
It is home to the eponymous abbey, built here in 1170 with the patronage of the Patriarch of Aquileia. St. Charles Borromeo was its abbot.

Twin towns

Follina is twinned with:
 Wipfeld, Germany

References
Notes

Cities and towns in Veneto